Şuçoat Ne'matov (born 26 September 1981) is a Tajikistani footballer whose last known club was Regar-TadAZ Tursunzoda.

Career

International
Nematov was included in the Tajikistan national football team for having won the 2006 AFC Challenge Cup.

Career statistics

International

Statistics accurate as of 22 October 2015

International goals

Honours
Regar-TadAZ
Tajik League (3): 2006, 2007, 2008
Tajik Cup (2): 2005, 2006
AFC President's Cup (3): 2005, 2008, 2009
Tajikistan
AFC Challenge Cup (1): 2006

References

External links

1981 births
Living people
Tajikistani footballers
Tajikistan international footballers
Association football forwards